Anze Urankar (born 17 January 1997) is a Slovenian male canoeist who won nine medals at senior level at the Wildwater Canoeing World Championships.

Medals at the World Championships
Senior

References

External links
 

1997 births
Living people
Slovenian male canoeists
Place of birth missing (living people)
Youth Olympic gold medalists for Slovenia